In Inuit mythology, Tulugaak was the creator of light. The meaning of tulugaq is 'raven'; cf. the god Tuluŋigraq ("something like a raven").

Sometimes related to other sky gods, like Torngarsuk and Anguta from Inuit pantheon.

Notes

References
 

Inuit gods
Legendary crows
Light gods
Sky and weather gods